Lactase-like is a protein that in humans is encoded by the LCTL gene. Lactase-like is a glycosidase enzyme.

Function 
This gene encodes a member of family 1 glycosidases. Glycosidases are enzymes that hydrolyze glycosidic bonds and are classified into families based on primary amino acid sequence. Most members of family 1 have two conserved glutamic acid residues, which are required for enzymatic activity. The mouse ortholog of this protein has been characterized and has a domain structure of an N-terminal signal peptide, glycosidase domain, transmembrane domain, and a short cytoplasmic tail. It lacks one of the conserved glutamic acid residues important for catalysis, and its function remains to be determined (PMID: 12084582). Alternative splicing results in multiple transcript variants. [provided by RefSeq, Jun 2013]

References

Further reading 

 
 
 

Genes on human chromosome 15